New Jasper is an unincorporated community in Greene County, in the U.S. state of Ohio.

History
A post office called New Jasper was established in 1847, and remained in operation until 1905. New Jasper moved to its present location in the 1870s when the railroad was extended to that point.

References

Unincorporated communities in Greene County, Ohio
1847 establishments in Ohio
Populated places established in 1847
Unincorporated communities in Ohio